Live at House of Blues New Orleans is a live album and DVD released by the band Better Than Ezra on September 28, 2004 as their sixth album, first of two live albums, and their only on Sanctuary Records. The album and DVD were recorded and filmed at two separate shows at the House of Blues in New Orleans during the summer of 2004 and have different track listings.  The DVD is longer as it has eight tracks not available on the CD.  Additionally, there are two studio tracks featured on the CD that are not on the DVD.

The album features then current band members; Kevin Griffin - lead vocals, guitar (1988–present), Tom Drummond - bass guitar, backing vocals (1988–present), Travis McNabb - drums (1996 - 2009), and James Arthur Payne - Guitar, Keyboards, backing vocals.  The album also features three guest musicians; Mark Mullins -trombonist, Eric Lucero - trumpeter, and John Gros - B3 Organ Player.

CD
"Intro"  
"Misunderstood"  
"Good"  
"Rolling"
"Live Again"
"Get You In"
"Extra Ordinary"
"King of New Orleans"
"Rosealia"
"At the Stars"
"A Lifetime"
"In the Blood"
"Porcelain"
"Sincerely, Me"
"Desperately Wanting"
"Cold Year" (new studio track)
"Stall" (new studio track)

DVD 
"Intro"
"Recognize" [DVD only]  
"Misunderstood"  
"Good"  
"Rolling"
"Live Again"
"Allison Foley" [DVD only]
"Get You In"
"Extra Ordinary"
"King of New Orleans"
"Rosealia"
"Beautiful Mistake" DVD only
"At the Stars"
"Waxing or Waning" [DVD only]
 "A Lifetime"
"This Time of Year" [DVD only]
"Sincerely, Me"
"Desperately Wanting"
"Porcelain" [DVD only]
"In the Blood" [DVD only]
"Use Me" (Bill Withers cover) [DVD only]

Personnel
Kevin Griffin - Lead vocals, guitar 
Travis McNabb - Drums
Tom Drummond - Bass, backing vocals
James Arthur Payne - Guitar, Keyboards, backing vocals
  Mark Mullins -trombonist
 Eric Lucero - trumpeter
 John Gros - B3 Organ Player

Official Site
www.betterthanezra.com

References

Better Than Ezra albums
2004 video albums
Live video albums
2004 live albums
Live post-grunge albums
Albums recorded at the House of Blues